This page provides supplementary chemical data on carbon dioxide.

Material Safety Data Sheet  

The handling of this chemical may incur notable safety precautions. It is highly recommended that you seek the Material Safety Datasheet (MSDS) for this chemical from a reliable source such as SIRI, and follow its directions.  MSDS for solid carbon dioxide is available from Pacific Dry Ice, inc.

Structure and properties

Thermodynamic properties

Solubility in water at various temperatures

 ‡Second column of table indicates solubility at each given temperature in volume of CO2 as it would be measured at 101.3 kPa and 0 °C per volume of water. 
 The solubility is given for "pure water", i.e., water which contain only CO2.  This water is going to be acidic.  For example, at 25 °C the pH of 3.9 is expected (see carbonic acid). At less acidic pH values, the solubility will increase because of the pH-dependent speciation of CO2.

Vapor pressure of solid and liquid

Table data obtained from CRC Handbook of Chemistry and Physics 44th ed. Annotation "(s)" indicates equilibrium temperature of vapor over solid. Otherwise temperature is equilibrium of vapor over liquid. For kPa values, where datum is whole numbers of atmospheres exact kPa values are given, elsewhere 2 significant figures derived from mm Hg data.

Phase diagram

Liquid/vapor equilibrium thermodynamic data
The table below gives thermodynamic data of liquid CO2 in equilibrium with its vapor at various temperatures. Heat content data, heat of vaporization, and entropy values are relative to the liquid state at 0 °C temperature and 3483 kPa pressure. To convert heat values to joules per mole values, multiply by 44.095 g/mol. To convert densities to moles per liter, multiply by 22.678 cm3 mol/(L·g). Data obtained from CRC Handbook of Chemistry and Physics, 44th ed. pages 2560–2561, except for critical temperature line (31.1 °C) and temperatures −30 °C and below, which are taken from Lange's Handbook of Chemistry, 10th ed. page 1463.

Spectral data

Notes

References

Carbon dioxide
Chemical data pages
Chemical data pages cleanup